Forficulinae is a subfamily of earwigs in the family Forficulidae.  There are about 12 genera and more than 160 described species in Forficulinae.

Genera
The subfamily contains the following genera:
 Afroforficula Steinmann, 1993
 Apterygida Westwood, 1840
 Chamaipites Burr, 1907
 Doru Burr, 1907
 Elaunon Burr, 1907
 Forficula Linnaeus, 1758
 Guanchia Burr, 1911
 Mesolabia Shiraki, 1905
 Parlax Burr, 1911
 Proforficula Steinmann, 1993
 Skalistes Brindle, 1970
 Tauropygia Brindle, 1970

References

Forficulidae